The 1966–67 Rugby Union County Championship was the 67th edition of England's premier rugby union club competition at the time.

Surrey and Durham County were declared joint champions after two drawn matches. For Surrey it was their first ever success while Durham County recorded their seventh title but first since 1909.

Semi finals

Final

Final Replay

See also
 English rugby union system
 Rugby union in England

References

Rugby Union County Championship
County Championship (rugby union) seasons